The ARCA Menards Series West, formerly the NASCAR K&N Pro Series West,  NASCAR AutoZone West Series, NASCAR Winston West Series and NASCAR Camping World West Series, is a regional stock car racing series owned and operated by the Automobile Racing Club of America (ARCA) and the National Association for Stock Car Auto Racing (NASCAR). The series was first formed in 1954 as a proving ground for drivers from the western United States who could not travel to race in the more traditional stock car racing regions like North Carolina and the rest of the southern United States.

In 1954, the series was formed under the name Pacific Coast Late Model circuit, with nine races on the schedule. At first the series sanctioned races on dirt tracks and paved tracks, but as the series developed, more races were held on paved tracks, with the final race on a dirt track being held in 1979 until the series returned to dirt in 2018. In 1988, the series traveled out of the United States for the first time, sanctioning a race in Australia. Eight years later, the series once again traveled outside the United States to Japan. In 1999, the season finale was held at Twin Ring Motegi, making it the first NASCAR championship race held in a different country. Four years later, NASCAR consolidated the Busch North Series into the series.

Jack McCoy has the most career wins in the series with 54, followed by Ray Elder with 47. Elder, however, has recorded six championships, the most out of any driver in the series. Other notable drivers who participated in the series include Ryan Blaney, Kevin Harvick, Brendan Gaughan, Derrike Cope, Chad Little and David Gilliland.

The other regional division at the Grand National level of ARCA is the Menards Series East.

History

The Menards Series West began in 1954 as the Pacific Coast Late Model circuit. Nine races were in held in the first year, many of which were held in California, in cities such as Oakland, San Diego, San Mateo and Gardena. The inaugural series championship was won by Lloyd Dane driving a 1953 Hudson Hornet.

Afterward, the series became known as the Grand National West Series, then the Winston Grand National West Series. In the beginning the series also raced on dirt ovals, but as the series developed began to race only on paved tracks, with the last race held on a dirt oval until 2018 being in 1979.

Though the series primarily sanctions races in the United States, the series has also traveled to Australia in 1988 and Japan from 1996 to 1998 for exhibition races. The series became the first series to sanction a championship race outside the United States in 1999, when the final race was held at Twin Ring Motegi. In 2003, the Busch North Series was consolidated into the series forming the modern day series. For the 2008 season, Camping World  bought naming rights of the series, renaming it the Camping World West Series. Two years later, K&N Engineering, Inc. replaced Camping World as the title sponsor.

A total of 110 different drivers have scored wins in the series with Jack McCoy having the most with 54, followed by Ray Elder who has 47 wins. Elder has scored the most championships with six, while Bill Schmitt and Roy Smith each have four.

The series has also had several notable NASCAR drivers throughout the years, including Ryan Blaney, Kevin Harvick, Brendan Gaughan, Derrike Cope, Chad Little and David Gilliland.

In 2020, the series will become part of the ARCA Menards Series banner and renamed to the ARCA Menards Series West.

ARCA Menards Series cars

General
As part of NASCAR's unification of the two Camping World Series in 2003, the cars can be either a 105-inch (2,700 mm, which had been used in the former Busch Grand National East) or 110-inch (2,800 mm, which had been used in the former Winston West) wheelbase. Cambered/off-set rear ends are not allowed.

The car bodies are typically a hand-built steel body, however teams may also use a one-piece composite body. The composite body is a "common" item that may be run as any manufacturer branded car (i.e. only one style of composite body for all four car manufacturers [Ford, Chevy, Dodge, Toyota]). Teams then "brand" the composite body by the grill opening, quarter window openings and the vehicle decal package (head lights, tail lights, etc.). Due to the introduction of the Car of Tomorrow in the NASCAR Sprint Cup Series, many of the vehicles on the series are old Sprint Cup cars. Another popular way to get a complete body is to buy a "cut-off" body from a Nationwide series team and mount it on a chassis.

Teams have an option of building their own engines or they may run a specification engine, similar to what is used in many short tracks. Both engines are V8, pushrod, 12:1 compression motors.  "Built" motors are built to team specifications using any configuration of pieces as long as it still meets NASCAR specifications. The spec engine is built using NASCAR-Approved pieces that may be purchased from an approved supplier. The engines may be purchased as a kit or pre-assembled. All of the spec pieces are individually encrypted with a barcode for verification and tracking purposes and can be checked during the inspection process with an encryption reader.

When the series first started, the cars ran a V6 engine with a maximum  displacement and no compression limit . In the early/mid 1990s the V8 engine with a 9.5:1 compression and maximum  displacement was introduced to the series as an alternative to the V6 engines. Due to the decrease in popularity of the V6, it was phased out for the 1999 season. When the East and West series rules were combined, the compression ratio changed to 12:1.

Cars may use leaded or unleaded fuel. However, when running in conjunction with one of the three national touring (Truck, Xfinity, Cup) series, unleaded fuel must be used.

On November 4, 2014 at the SEMA Show in Las Vegas, NASCAR president Mike Helton unveiled a new body style for the K&N Pro Series based on the Sprint Cup Series Gen 6 models. The new body, developed with Five Star Race Car Bodies, is constructed of a composite laminate blend and designed with easily replaceable body panels, expected to shrink the costs of fabrication dramatically. The body style is eligible for use in both Menards Series competition and ARCA Racing Series competition, replacing the old Gen 4-style steel bodies after 2015, and the current one-piece composite body after 2016. The Chevrolet SS, Ford Fusion, and Toyota Camry bodies used in Sprint Cup are the basis of the new bodies. No Dodge option is available with this car.

Along with all of ARCA and NASCAR's international series, the Menards Series have General Tire as their exclusive tire supplier.

Specifications
Engine displacement:  358 cu in (5.8 L) Pushrod V8.
Transmission:  4 speed Manual.
Weight:  3,300 lb (1,497 kg) Minimum (without driver).
Power output:  ~650 hp (485 kW) unrestricted.
Fuel:  Sunoco Leaded or Unleaded gasoline.
Fuel capacity:  22 U.S. gallons (83.2 L).
Fuel delivery:  Carburetion.
Compression ratio:  12:1.
Aspiration:  Naturally aspirated.
Carburetor size:  390 cu ft/min (184 L/s) 4-barrel.
Wheelbase:  105 in (2667 mm)/ 110 in (2794 mm).
Steering:  Power, recirculating ball.

List of champions

 Bold and italicized driver indicates he/she has won at least 1 of both NASCAR Cup Series and NASCAR Xfinity Series championships.

See also

West Coast Stock Car Hall of Fame, a Late Model race car hall of fame featuring many of the series' champions.

References

NASCAR Nextel Cup Series 2006 Media Guide. Daytona Beach, FL: NASCAR PR, 2006.

External links

Statistics, News and History

 
Automobile Racing Club of America
Sports in the Western United States
Auto racing series in the United States
Stock car racing
Stock car racing series in the United States
K&N Pro West
Stock car racing series